Beware the Batman is an American computer-animated television series based on the DC Comics superhero Batman. The series premiered in the United States on Cartoon Network on July 13, 2013, as part of their DC Nation block, replacing Batman: The Brave and the Bold. The series was produced by Warner Bros. Animation and DC Entertainment. The series ran on Cartoon Network until it was pulled from the schedule four months after its premiere, without official explanation. After the series was put on hiatus, the remaining episodes of the series began to air on Adult Swim's Toonami programming block, from July 27 to September 28, 2014.

Synopsis
The series is set during Bruce Wayne's early years as the Batman, following his initial period of battling organized crime. Over the course of the season, he hones his skills with the assistance of his butler Alfred Pennyworth. Bruce is introduced to Alfred's goddaughter Tatsu Yamashiro. Tatsu is a martial arts swordsmaster hired to act as Bruce's bodyguard, but also recruited to act as a superhero partner to Batman.

Characters

Crime-fighting vigilante Batman teams up with swordmistress Katana and his ex-secret agent butler Alfred Pennyworth to face the criminal underworld led by Anarky, Magpie, Ra's al Ghul, Tobias Whale, Phosphorus Rex, Professor Pyg, Mister Toad, Lady Shiva, Key, Killer Croc, and Humpty Dumpty. Anarky, in particular, was intended to be the main villain in the series.

While the developers allowed themselves license to stylize the characters' appearances, the villains were particularly designed to be "over the top".

Production

Background
 After Batman: The Brave and the Bold ended its run in November 2011, a new series went under production, so that Batman could return to a more "serious tone". With Batman receiving a new sidekick, Outsiders member Katana, Register even commented that "Katana is gonna be his new Robin, but not necessarily." The series was a 3D computer-animated format, similar to the earlier Green Lantern: The Animated Seriess animation style.

In the wake of the 2012 Aurora, Colorado shooting, which occurred during a screening of the Batman movie The Dark Knight Rises, it was announced that the series content would be altered in order to make the firearms in the show look less realistic. In addition initial announcements for the series were accompanied with promotional art that was not intended for public release, depicting Alfred as a gun-toting butler. This upset fans of the Batman mythos, who argued against Alfred's participation in Batman's exploits, and his use of deadly firearms as against the Batman's principles. In response to fan criticism, producer Glen Murakami acknowledged that this poster image was an inaccurate representation of what the character's actual role would be. He elaborated that the poster was intended to be an action-themed shot that displayed the cast of characters, but that Alfred's portrayal had been misleadingly made more exciting. "You can't have an action pose of a guy standing with a tray", joked Murakami. Mitch Watson also noted the problem presented if Alfred were fighting alongside Batman, as he would be recognized as Bruce Wayne's butler, and thus reveal the identity of Batman. Regardless, both producers insisted that Alfred would remain true to his intended characterization as a mentor to Batman, who could potentially help Batman if a story plot called for it. Scott Thill, technology and pop culture commentator for Wired magazine, praised the initial choice to debut the villain Anarky on television, claiming the character was relevant following the rise of the Occupy movement and the hacktivist activities of Anonymous.

In promoting the series, Warner Bros. debuted a trailer a month prior to the series premier, featuring action sequences from the first three episodes, highlighting Batman, Professor Pyg and Toad, Magpie, and Anarky. On July 2, the opening title sequence was released to Entertainment Weekly, a week prior to the series premiere. It depicts Batman, Alfred, Katana, and the Batmobile, in a stylized red background with stark red lighting effects, contrasted by dark shadows and silhouettes. The show's opening theme is composed by the indie rock band the Dum Dum Girls.

3D development

The requirements of 3D animation at times necessitated that inanimate objects such as ships and city streets were built, rather than simply drawn, creating a need for the completion of entire set designs. This would increase production times, but later allow the developers to bring cinematic qualities of lighting and camera play to the series. Batman's utility belt was fully recreated from cardboard and worn by producer Glen Murakami's design team, to test how the belt would function while in motion. "If you really built it, it would work", said Watson. Batarangs were designed to flip-open and function when retrieved from the belt. The Batmobile was also subjected to scrutiny, as a "certain amount of weight" was added to it as it moved on city streets, out of concern that it would be unbelievable otherwise.

Broadcast
Three months after the series premiere, Beware the Batman was pulled from the Cartoon Network schedule and put on hiatus on October 23, 2013. Cartoon Network did not provide an official explanation, leading fans to believe that the series had already been cancelled. Cartoon Network then moved the series to the Toonami programming block on the network's late-night Adult Swim block. Toonami first aired the series on Sunday, May 11, 2014, during the early-morning time slots. Cartoon Network then declared the series a financial failure and decided to "write it off", removing it from the network altogether. On September 28, Toonami ran a marathon consisting of the final seven unaired episodes to avoid abruptly ending the series run.

The show made its Canadian premiere on October 11, 2013 on Teletoon.

Episodes

Awards and nominations

Home video
On February 18, 2014, the first 13 episodes of the series were released on Blu-ray and DVD in a collection titled Beware The Batman: Season 1 Part 1 – Shadows of Gotham. The twelfth and thirteenth episodes had yet to air, despite being released on this collection. A second collection, titled Beware The Batman: Season 1 Part 2 – Dark Justice, was released on September 30, 2014 containing the remaining 13 episodes of the show's only season.

Adaptations
Writers Mike W. Barr (co-creator of the character Katana), Scott Beatty, Matt Manning, and Ivan Cohen (who wrote the episode "Unique") and artists Luciano Vecchio and Dario Brizuela produced an original DC Comics comic book set in the continuity of the television series.
 DC Nation #2 (vol 1) (2012-11-07)
 Beware the Batman #1 (2013-10-23)
 Beware the Batman #2 (2013-11-27)
 Beware the Batman #3 (2013-12-31): In the mouth of the Whale!
 Beware the Batman #4 (2014-01-29): Bat vs. Bat
 Beware the Batman #5 (2014-02-26): Two Katanas?! But which one is the real Katana?!
 Beware the Batman #6 (2014-03-26): First-Person Shooter
 Beware the Batman (2015-01-21): Includes issues 1–6, Rough Seas (from DC Nation Free Comic Book Day Super Sampler: Beware the Batman/Teen Titans Go! #1).

An online game titled 'Gotham Streets' was posted in Cartoon Network site in 2014.

See also
 List of animated television series of 2013
 List of programs broadcast by Cartoon Network
 List of television series based on DC Comics

References

External links

 DC page: TV, comics
 Cartoon Network page
 
 
 Beware the Batman at The World's Finest
 Beware the Batman at Legionsofgotham.org
 Beware the Batman at Batman-On-Film.com

2010s American animated television series
2010s American science fiction television series
2013 American television series debuts
2014 American television series endings
Adult Swim original programming
American animated action television series
American animated adventure television series
American animated science fiction television series
American animated science fantasy television series
American animated superhero television series
American computer-animated television series
Animated Batman television series
Cartoon Network original programming
DC Nation
English-language television shows
Animated television shows based on DC Comics
Television series by Warner Bros. Animation
Toonami